Thillu Mullu is a 2013 Tamil-language comedy film directed by Badri who earlier directed Veerappu and Ainthaam Padai. It is a remake of the 1981 film of the same name which was a remake of the 1979 Hindi film Gol Maal. The film stars Shiva and Isha Talwar. Prakash Raj enacted the character played by Thengai Srinivasan. Kovai Sarala, Soori, Sathyan, Ilavarasu and Manobala played supporting roles. The music was jointly scored by M. S. Viswanathan and Yuvan Shankar Raja who for the first time worked together. While the film's muhurat took place on 24 August, the shooting commenced in September. The film released on 14 June 2013 to highly positive reviews and became a super hit at the box office.

Plot
Pasupathy is a carefree man who is unemployed. He lives with his younger sister Kavitha and house maid Senthamarai who is a part-time black market liquor seller. Kavitha is in love with Pasupathy's close friend Mano which Pasupathy is not aware of. Mano indirectly tries to convey that to him to which he does not understand. Pasupathy's maternal uncle is a lawyer and their caretaker since their parents died. Pasupathy loses his house to a bank on a surety crisis which involved his father. Hence he is compelled to settle in a job. Pasupathy's uncle applies for an opening in his friend's mineral water company "Classique" for marketing head post. He gives many instructions about the owner Sivagurunathan who is an ardent devotee of Murugan and who is against recommendations. Pasupathy manages to get the job by dressing in a simple Gandhian manner, posing as a Murugan devotee and tells he follows very valuable principles written in the book of Sivagurunathan himself which attracts Sivagurunathan.

Pasupathy one day lies to his boss that his mother got injured and leaves to watch an IPL match. There he enjoys a lot with his friends by drinking, screaming, cheering, etc. which is seen by Sivagurunathan as he was present on his friend's invite for a business purpose. Sivagurunathan is furious on Pasupathy's behaviour and he captures his activities on mobile. The next day he issues termination order to Pasupathy. To secure his job, Pasupathy lies that Sivagurunathan has actually seen his identical twin brother GanguLee Kandhan, a karate master who has blue eyes unlike his. Sivagurunathan believes him half-heartedly and yet gives him his job again.

Sivagurunathan has a daughter Janani who learns everything half baked. Her interest turns to learning self-defense skills and tells her father to appoint a master to teach Karate. Sivagurunathan calls Pasupathy to send his brother for Karate coaching. Pasupathy wears blue contact lens and visits his home and manages to make Sivagurunathan believe he is Gangulee. Pasupathy and Janani had already met when Pasupathy rushed to save Janani from fire, but Janani ended up saving him. Pasupathy is attracted to Janani and he impresses both Janani and her maternal grandmother. Sivagurunathan meets a bank officer who actually took Pasupathy's house. She tells him that Pasupathy is actually a fraud and she has not met anyone like Gangulee which confuses Sivagurunathan. He appoints a CID officer to follow Pasupathy and find out if he has a brother GanguLee. Pasupathy manages to cheat the officer and make him believe that there are two brothers. But he innocently behaves and submits his and GanguLee's resignation letter to him telling that his mother did not want them to work for a boss who doubts their loyalty. Sivagurunathan says that he would apologise for his doubtful behavior to his mother which creates further trouble for Pasupathy.  He rushes home and disguises Senthamarai to act as his mother. Sivagurunathan believes that setup and apologises to Pasupathy's "mother".

Janani falls for GanguLee and she wants him to find if he loves her and she keeps him a test. She wants him to wish for her birthday on the following Tuesday and she will not tell him that she is going to Dubai. Pasupathy tries to get information from Janani's grandmother. He goes to Sivagurunthan and tells Gangulee has gone to Dubai which angers Sivagurunathan as he doubts that GanguLee has gone to impress his daughter. Pasupathy pretends to say that he will go to Dubai and stop his brother and bring back his daughter to which Sivagurunathan accepts. Sivagurunathan plans to marry off his daughter to Pasupathy against Janani's wishes. Pasupathy goes to Dubai and both propose their love. Mano blackmails Pasupathy into letting him marry Kavitha otherwise he would reveal his double act to Sivagurunathan. Pasupathy, with no other option, arranges for their marriage. Janani leaves her home as she does not want to marry Pasupathy but GanguLee. But upon realising Pasupathy's fraud she angrily beats him. He convinces her by saying all he did is for her sake which cools her. Sivagurunathan misunderstands that Janani is going to marry Gangulee and rushes to stop it but finds that GanguLee is Pasupathy himself. He furiously chases him and Pasupathy runs. In the temple, he bumps into a man who is being forced to marry a girl against his wishes. They concoct a plan to foll Sivagurunathan. After several chases and runs Pasupathy manages to get the chance to marry Janani, but declines as he does not want to marry Janani against his boss' wishes. Sivagurunathan changes his mind and lets them marry.

Cast

 Shiva as Pasupathy/GanguLee Kandhan
 Isha Talwar as Janani
 Prakash Raj as Sivagurunathan
 Kovai Sarala as Senthamarai
 Soori as Mano
 Monisha as Kavitha
 Sathyan as Sathyan/Action King
 Manobala as Sounderrajan
 Ilavarasu as Pasupathy's Uncle
 Sachu as Janani's Grandmother
 Devadarshini as Bank Manager
 Ajay Rathnam as Janani No. 2's Father
 Ashvin Raja as Shiva's friend
 Thalapathy Dinesh
 Swaminathan as Employee 
Kaali Venkat as Shiva's friend
George Maryan as Detective 
 Shyam as Sounderrajan's nephew
 Suhashini as Janani's Friend
 Krishnamoorthy as Santhanam's father
 Manikka Vinayagam as Mano's father
 Santhanam as American mappilai (special Appearance)
 Venkat Prabhu as himself (special Appearance)
 Sakthi Saravanan as himself (special Appearance)
 Bosskey (special Appearance)
 Blaaze as Senthilkumaran (special Appearance)
 Valerie Nobbe (special Appearance)
 Sakthi Chidambaram Himself (special Appearance)
K. Sivasankar as Choreographer (special Appearance)
 M. S. Viswanathan (special Appearance in song "Thillu Mullu")
 Yuvan Shankar Raja (special Appearance in song "Thillu Mullu")

Production
In July 2012, Shiva confirmed that was he going to do the remake Thillu Mullu that was likely to be produced by KB's daughter Pushpa Kandasamy. Shiva and Vendhar Movies approached Badri to direct the film. Badri said that he ventured into Thillu Mullu with an open mind. "I wanted to make the storyline contemporary. Retaining the characters from the original, I wrote the script to suit today’s generation". The film was launched on 24 August 2012 with a puja at the Image Auditorium at MRC Nagar in Chennai. Celebs included Karthi, Sneha, Prasanna, Meena, S. A. Chandrasekhar, Ambika, Vijay Antony, K. Balachander, Vaali and Dharani were present at the launch. The team after shooting in Chennai and Hyderabad headed to Dubai and Abu Dhabi to can a few songs and scenes. The songs Ragaangal Pathinaru was also shot in Dubai. The shooting was completed in March 2013. After wrapping up the shoot, Badri decided to shoot a music video of the 'Thillu Mullu' remix and convinced the M. S. Viswanathan to appear alongside Yuvan Shankar Raja in the iconic song.

Isha Talwar was roped in to do Madhavi’s role from the original in the film. Her voice was dubbed by Krithika Nelson. Prakash Raj reprised the character played by Thengai Srinivasan. Director Badri stated "the challenge was to cast someone in Thengai Srinivasan’s role. I couldn’t think of anyone other than Prakash Raj". Kovai Sarala was selected to play Sowcar Janaki's role. Santhanam reprised the special guest appearance by Kamal Haasan. Bosskey informed that he appeared in the opening sequence "as a fake godman who tries to transform a vertically-challenged person into a normal one".

Soundtrack

Yuvan Shankar Raja and M. S. Viswanathan, the composer of the original Thillu Mullu joined hands for the first time in Thillu Mullu and handled the music for the cult film's remake together. Two songs from the original — ‘Thillu Mullu’ (remix) and ‘Ragangal Pathinaaru’ — have been retained, and two fresh songs composed. About the remix, Yuvan said, "I just wanted to give the original theme music a contemporary sound. I have not touched the song ‘Ragangal Pathinaaru’, which has been sung by singer Karthik." While M. S. Viswanathan composed the tunes, Yuvan Shankar Raja orchestrated and recorded them. The audio launch was held on 1 June at the Victoria Hall in Geneva, Switzerland along with the audios of Nalanum Nandhiniyum and Sutta Kadhai.

Release
Thillu Mullu released on 14 June 2013 alongside another comedy film Theeya Velai Seiyyanum Kumaru. It released on 500+ screens worldwide.

Critical reception
M. Suganth of The Times of India gave 3.5/5 and said, "Much of the credit for this (film) should go to director Badri, whose script clearly suggests that some amount of thought has gone into reworking a cult classic for present-day audiences. Instead of going for a scene by scene remake, he manages to spin newer situations that make it very much a film of our times."  in.com said, "Thillu Mullu is good fun while it lasts and enjoyable for Shiva’s antics. Any remake’s success is when it makes us forget the original and this new Thillu Mullu does that well with different situations and a decent cast". Behindwoods said, "The strong point of the film is definitely Shiva and he suits the role of Pasupathy and Kandhan Ganguly so effortlessly." IndiaGlitz said, "For diehard Rajini lovers, who were a lot concerned about how this movie would fare off and will it do justice to the original, yes this has no way harmed the original indeed. If Superstar's 'Thillu mullu' was clean and a complete family entertainer, so is this remake." Sify said, "Thillu Mullu on the whole is a laugh riot, go have your fun. The film, in the end, is a broad entertainer that plays to the gallery. Keep your expectations in check, and you are sure to come out with a smile." The New Indian Express wrote, "Breezy and fun-filled, Thillu Mullu keeps one entertained for the most part".

On the other hand, S. Saraswathi of rediff.com wrote that the film "fails to evoke spontaneous laughter and lacks the brilliance and rib-tickling humour of the original." Zeenews.com too was critical of the film, "One of the glaring differences between the two versions is the treatment of comedy. While in the original it was sensible and funny, it is loud and commercial in the remake. Despite a few rib-tickling moments between Shiva and Prakash Raj, ‘Thillu Mullu’ suffers due to extended running time and skewed screenplay." Baradwaj Rangan of the Hindu wrote "The film, in its earlier avatar, was aided immensely by the eye-rolling eccentricities of ‘Thengai’ Srinivasan, which is exactly what's needed when the hero is playing it straight. Prakash Raj, here, isn't allowed that kind of leeway — he's given nothing to work with. And things are made worse by a screenplay that moves in fits and starts, never building up steam. Isn't there more to comedy than one-liners?
"

Box office

The film clashed with big release Theeya Velai Seiyyanum Kumaru but managed to collect  3.2 crore on opening day. On second day growth improvement collected  3.8 crore making  9.5 crore but lesser than Theeya Velai Seiyyanum Kumaru. The made an average business during its first week collected  24 crore at the box office. The film did a good business in overseas. The film 6 weeks collection around worldwide  50 crore at the box office. The film successfully completed 50 days in 38 centers.

Controversies
Prior to release, Visu (the writer for the original Thillu Mullu) filed a civil suit against Vendhar Movies, restraining them from releasing the remake. According to him, the remake had the same screenplay and dialogues as the original version, and the producers did not seek permission to remake his film. However, the court dismissed the case, concluding that the remake did not have the same screenplay as the original version, allowing it to release on 14 June.

References

External links
 

2013 films
Indian comedy films
2013 comedy films
Remakes of Indian films
Tamil remakes of Hindi films
Films scored by M. S. Viswanathan
Films scored by Yuvan Shankar Raja
2010s Tamil-language films
Films shot in Chennai
Films shot in Hyderabad, India
Films shot in Abu Dhabi
Films shot in Dubai
Films directed by Badri